Always Goodbye is a 1938 American romantic drama film directed by Sidney Lanfield and starring Barbara Stanwyck, Herbert Marshall, and Ian Hunter.

Plot
Following the death of her fiancé as he was speeding to their wedding, Margot Weston is left pregnant and devastated. A former doctor, Jim Howard, helps the desperate Margot. When her son is born, Jim helps her find a home for the baby with Phil Marshall and his wife. Margot insists that neither the Marshalls nor the child can ever know that she is his mother.

Five years later, while working as a well-paid buyer for couturier Harriet Martin, Margot meets Jim Howard again, and the two begin to fall in love. When Margot is sent to Europe on a business trip for Harriet, she meets and is wooed by the charming and carefree Count Giovanni Corini. While in Paris, she happens to meet her son, Roddy, who is traveling with his aunt who has been taking care of him since his adoptive mother died.

On the trip back to America, Margot and Roddy become close. Giovanni is also on the same ship, and he continues to pursue Margot. Back home, Margot becomes convinced that Jessica Reid, Phil's new fiancée, does not love him, and would be a bad mother to Roddy. Margot decides to break up the engagement, though Jim, beginning a career as a scientist, reminds her of her earlier promise not to interfere in the boy's life.

Phil overhears a conversation between Margot and Jessica which brings their engagement to an end. Meanwhile, Jim tries to ask Margot to marry him, but then Phil asks Margot to marry him for his and Roddy's sake. Though Margot admits she loves Jim, he steps aside so that she can have a life with Roddy and Phil.

Cast

References

External links

Always Goodbye at Rotten Tomatoes

1938 films
1938 romantic drama films
20th Century Fox films
American black-and-white films
American romantic drama films
Films directed by Sidney Lanfield
Films with screenplays by Kathryn Scola
1930s English-language films
1930s American films